JumpStart Adventures 4th Grade: Haunted Island is a personal computer game in Knowledge Adventure's JumpStart series of educational software intended to teach a fourth grade curriculum. The game was released on December 2, 1996. 

On November 24, 1997 and on August 26, 1998, revised versions of the game were published. Although little was changed in terms of gameplay, an in-game map was added, and the difficulty select was given an icon.
In 1999, the game was retired and allegedly due to its frightening tone, it was replaced by JumpStart Adventures 4th Grade: Sapphire Falls.

Plot and gameplay

A peaceful schoolhouse with white picket fences are shown in the beginning with pleasant music. Suddenly, lightning flashes, and the schoolhouse and the fences take on a twisted shape. Inside, the substitute teacher named Ms. Grunkle (who reveals herself to be a witch) casts a spell on a frightened girl named Zev Cosmo. Although Zev's face is blacked out when the effects take place, we can see her turning into a monster. The same thing happens to Wolfgang, then Albert Brayne. Then a half-dozen of frightened students named Violet, Jane Plain, Penny Scilin, James, Tiffany, Stanley ZeBlucky, and Joe are all turned into monsters one-by-one. Ms. Grunkle flies on her broomstick to her house. Along the way, she drops the 25 skeleton keys to her house and her magic wand by Madame Pomreeda's carriage. After that, the words "Haunted Island" appear on the screen. (The other three students not shown in the introduction are: Calvin, Laura, and Debbie.)

During the game, the player is given missions by Madame Pomreeda. These missions require the player to complete three games to find a student's favorite things. Once the player has completed four missions, the character will be returned to normal, and the player will move on to another student. The game keeps track of a player's successes and failures, and a poor performance in one minigame will lead to it appearing more often.

The player also must collect all 25 keys in order to reach the attic, where the kids are being held. These are collected by earning 5000 points in one particular minigame.

The protagonist has a limited amount of "health," which is indicated by a candle in the upper left hand corner of the screen. Health is depleted through answering Repsac's questions incorrectly and is indicated by the candle burning down. If the candle burns out, the protagonist is cast into the island's labyrinth, which contains a "fountain of health" that will cause the candle to reburn and, eventually, grow back to its original size. However, finding one's way out of the labyrinth is difficult.

Storyline and Gameplay
The protagonist is a fourth-grade student who, fortunately, missed the day of school when the class's new substitute teacher was a witch named Ms. Grunkle.

After signing in at the schoolhouse, the protagonist is transported to Haunted Island off the Coast of West Africa. With the aid of a large purple bat named Flap and a fortune teller named Madame Pomreeda, the protagonist must rescue the thirteen lost classmates by collecting the students' "most prized possessions" from the island's educational activities. After these possessions (which reveal elements of the kid's personality) are collected, Madame Pomreeda transforms the classmate back with a chanting poem that dispels the monster and restores the child to normal.

Earning five thousand points, will earn the protagonist one of the keys to Ms. Grunkle's house. Five keys unlock one door and lead the protagonist into a new room. Whenever a room is entered for the first time, Ms. Grunkle appears and curses the protagonist into the labyrinth. Once the protagonist advances all the way through her house and makes it into her attic, where the rest of the class is locked up, the game is completed. However, if some of the kids are still monsters when the protagonist reaches that attic, Flap informs the protagonist they will have to be changed back before the attic can be entered. Note that it is almost impossible to not have all the keys by the time all the children have been changed back since merely playing the games that will save the kids provide all the points needed, but if you can achieve this by play the games at only low levels and keep getting all the answers right to do this.

Characters in the game

Ms. Grunkle
Ms. Grunkle is the game's villainess and the fourth-grade substitute teacher who turned the kids into monsters and brought them to Haunted Island, which she apparently rules over. Her appearance fits the popular depiction of a witch to a tee, with her having gray skin (although it's blue on the icon), black clothing and a pointed hat. Presumably, she was voiced by Jeannie Elias, since Elias was the only female voice actor credited.

Ms. Grunkle appears at the beginning and ending of the game as well as whenever the protagonist enters a new room in her house. Sometime after you finish playing one of the minigames she flies by on her broomstick to taunt the protagonist with typical villainous comments ("So, you think you're pretty good at my little games? Well, you haven't seen anything yet!") before flying off. Curiously, she is sometimes referred to as "Mrs. Grunkle," prompting one to wonder whatever became of her husband (she has a skeleton in her living room watching TV and holding a remote, which could have been her husband at one point). She does not have an explained motivation for her actions in the game.

Flap
Flap is a large, purple bat who provides help to the protagonist, most often by explaining how the game's activities are played. He is commonly seen as the mascot for this version of JumpStart 4th Grade (as Botley is for JumpStart 3rd Grade, Jo Hammet is for JumpStart 5th Grade, etc.) He was probably voiced by Tony Pope, and his voice is an imitation of that of the actor Peter Lorre.

Madame Pomreeda
Madame Pomreeda gives the player the challenges needed to save each kid. Each time she is visited, Madame Pomreeda gives the protagonist one of four cards, each containing three challenges. After the protagonist finishes with four cards, Madame Pomreeda will use the collected objects to determine what the child's true personality is and say a poem aloud to change the kid back. These poems, the spells she uses to activate her crystal ball and the cards she gives the protagonist all make great use of rhyming couplets.

Madame Pomreeda apparently lives in a circus carriage at the end of the island opposite Ms. Grunkle's house. Although she, her carriage and her magic seem to be very reminiscent of popular depictions of Gypsies, she is blonde-haired and blue-eyed and therefore does not have the physical appearance typically associated with the Roma people. According to Flap, Pomreeda has a "rotten sense of humor," considering the bugs in the Spider's Web activity cute.

Her name is an obvious play on palm reading. She was also probably voiced by Elias.

Repsac
Repsac, also referred to as Random Threat by the bugs in the spider web, is a menacing ghost who serves Ms. Grunkle. He occasionally springs upon the protagonist to ask multiple choice questions that will deplete the protagonist's health if answered incorrectly. Most of his questions seem to involve science and grammar, as well as sentence structure. This is presumably due to the fact that the game does not have activities which specifically address these topics.

Repsac is "Casper" spelled backwards, which is quite fitting considering that Repsac's personality is the complete opposite of Casper's. Repsac was probably voiced by Pope as well.

The kids
These kids are the protagonist's classmates and are shown in order of the haunted yearbook.

Games

The Spider's Web
At the beginning of this activity, a word is stated and given in a sentence. The user must then guide a tiny spider over a spider's web but it crawls over the letter-shaped bugs that correctly spell that word. On the higher levels, there is also a giant red spider that must be avoided. Once three words are spelled, the game is completed.

The Toad Well
Here, players move a toad around the top of a well to make it eat the number-shaped bug that correctly completes the equation at the bottom of the well. Eating one of the "poisonous" bugs that incorrectly complete the equation will make the toad sick. Also the user has to eat the purple bugs buzzing towards the top, Otherwise, the toad will fall in. After three "rounds" of the game are played, the activity is completed.

The Mutant Swamp
In this game, the user attempts to harvest various kinds of exotic swamp plants so that enough of them grow large enough to meet a given quota. To do this, the user must experiment to see how the different plants react to different amounts of light, water and space. On the first level, there is only one kind of plant needed, but, on the higher levels, the user must use two different kinds of plants on the same plot. The game is completed after three successful harvests.

The Clock Tower
Inside the island's clock tower, the user helps a hunchback named Semimoto (a play on "Quasimodo") play various pieces of music on an old keyboard. The user moves Semi's hand over to the correct key, indicated by a bat flying over a blank musical scale, and presses it. If the key is correct the bat will fly away, but, if the key is incorrect, a skull will appear to show where the key was pressed. If the user misses three times, a new round will begin. Three melodies must be played to complete the game. This game is reconceived as "Crystal Keys" in the newer version of JumpStart 4th Grade.

The Cemetery
In this game, the user selects the correct parts of speech to fill in the missing portions of a spooky story written on a tombstone in order to save a friendly ghost from the Grim Reaper. The constructed story does not have to make sense, but must merely be grammatically sound. On the higher levels, the user does not see the story and is only given the part of speech, making the game rather like Mad Libs. The ghost who appears at the end of the game to thank the user for saving him is modeled on Rodney Dangerfield. Three (identical) ghosts must be saved to complete the activity. In fact, the ghost is actually the same, as even he notes, despite the fact Madame Pomreeda's challenge specifies that three souls must be saved.

The Mummy's Tomb
Inside the island's token Egyptian tomb, mummies lie buried under stone tablets that have images and writings related to various bits of history on them. Here, the user must play a game resembling a simplified version of Mahjong solitaire to match the related tiles and uncover the mummy. However, there are rules regarding which tiles can be "selected" and, if no move is possible, the game resets. After three mummies have been uncovered, the game is completed. "Tablet Turnover" from the newer version of JumpStart 4th Grade is virtually identical to this game.

The Vampire Maze
In this game, the user must guide a vampire through a maze of hedges while avoiding a ghost who will turn the vampire into stone. In the center of the screen, a long division problem appears and the user must lead the vampire to the correct answer. Selecting the wrong number will cause another ghost to appear, although, if the user gets more than two ghosts, the extra ones will eventually fade away, leaving just the two. Once several division problems are solved, the vampire will be allowed to enter his coffin in the center of the screen. Three vampires must be put to rest in order for the game to be completed.

The Pirate Ship
In this game, the user controls a ghostly galleon on a giant map of the world. The user must use geography clues to discover which countries have buried treasures and move the ship over to the correct countries. The user must also take care to not run out of food and supplies, since doing so will end the game. This can be avoided by running the ship into the "food and supplies" icons scattered over the map. There are also "cannon ball" icons that come in useful if the user runs into one of the several pirate ships that speed across the map. The "Map Madness" activity in the second version of JumpStart 4th Grade is nearly identical to this game.

The Enchanted Forest
In this game, the user uses decimals and fractions to mix three magical potions that will turn a frog back into a "rather handsome" prince. The running gag of the game is that the "rather handsome" prince is actually pretty disfigured. Another running gag is that the same prince is repeatedly turned into a frog. You could also notice cameos of the characters from Jumpstart Preschool.

The Fountain of Health
The fountain of health is located in the center of the labyrinth. It is where people go to increase their health by answering questions similar to Repsac's. The more questions answered correctly, the more your candle will glow.

The game's conclusion
Once the protagonist enters the attic, Ms. Grunkle proclaims herself victorious before she attempts to transform all the students back into monsters along with the protagonist (this time it was intended to be permanent). However, the protagonist produces Ms. Grunkle's magic wand which protects the kids and the protagonist from the spell. Ms. Grunkle is temporarily shocked that the protagonist has acquired her wand, but then realizes that Madame Pomreeda must be responsible (the game's opening sequence depicts Ms. Grunkle accidentally dropping her wand next to Pomreeda's carriage). With that, Ms. Grunkle acknowledges defeat and flies out the window on her broom. The kids cheer at their regained freedom as a piece of paper Grunkle leaves behind on the floor reveals the schoolhouse being restored to its original state. After this, the game ends and the user's name appears in red on the sign-in list. The player can still play the game, but some areas (Pomreeda's carriage, Ms. Grunkle's house) are locked. 

In the original release, selecting a completed game file on the sign-in list and clicking the Start button will cause Flap to say, "You again? I didn't think you'd be back. Nothing personal, it's just that, well, you know, it's been quite an adventure. You've made it to Ms. Grunkle's house, and rescued all your classmates. Now you can sign in as a new player and visit all your favorite haunts. Just keep a sharp eye out for Ms. Grunkle, you never know when she's going to drop in."

In later releases, clicking the Start button when selecting a completed game file on the sign-in list will transport the player back to the island, and Flap will appear and say "You again? I didn't think you'd be back. Nothing personal, it's just that, well, you know, it's been quite an adventure. You've made it to Ms. Grunkle's house, and rescued all your classmates. Play more games outside on the island."

Connections
Wolfgang's name is a reference to Wolfgang Amadeus Mozart while Albert's name is a reference to Albert Einstein, Jane Plain is "Plain Jane" backwards, and "Penny Scilin" is a play on penicillin. Also, "Tiffany's" name likely refers to the famous jewelry store known as...well..."Tiffany's." Also the fact that "Joe" dresses in a football uniform means his name is likely inspired by NFL Legends, Joe Namath or Joe Montana.
Near Madame Pomreeda's carriage is a cage with "Cirque du Jumpe Starte" (the first part of this being French for "Circus of the" and the second an alteration of "JumpStart") written on it with images of characters from previous JumpStart products at the top. Pressing the up arrow key when facing the cage cuts to a spooky version of the town from JumpStart Pre-K. (Both JumpStart 4th Grade and Pre-K were developed by KnowWare) These characters can be seen lurking in the Haunted Woods. They include Eleanor Elephant, Casey Cat, Pierre Polar Bear, and Kisha Koala from JumpStart Preschool and C.J. the Frog from JumpStart 2nd Grade.

References

External links

1996 video games
JumpStart
Horror video games
Dark fantasy video games
Video games about witchcraft
Classic Mac OS games
Video games developed in the United States
Video games set on fictional islands
Windows games